The Federal Correctional Institution, Herlong (FCI Herlong) is a medium-security United States federal prison for male inmates in California, opened in 2007. It is operated by the Federal Bureau of Prisons, a division of the United States Department of Justice. The facility also includes a satellite prison camp that houses minimum-security male offenders.

FCI Herlong is located in Lassen County, in northeastern California near the Nevada border, approximately 60 miles northwest of Reno, Nevada and 190 miles northeast of Sacramento, California, the state capital. It is one of three prisons in the county; the other two are state prisons located in the county seat of Susanville. In 2007 half the adults in Susanville worked in one of the three facilities; together the three prisons hold approximately 11,000 inmates. Prisons are the major employers in the area since the timber industry declined.

Notable incidents
In 2009, a joint investigation conducted by the Bureau of Prisons, the FBI and the IRS uncovered a scheme in which three inmates at FCI Herlong: Scott Whitney, Diego Paucar and Erik Alexander, filled out false tax returns for other inmates seeking refunds. In order to portray the inmates as taxpayers, they made false W-2 forms using the names of real employers, but none of the inmates had actually worked for them. The IRS discovered the scheme and no refunds were actually paid. If the scheme had been successful, the three co-conspirators would have obtained $93,950 from the IRS. Whitney, Paucar and Alexander subsequently pleaded guilty to conspiring to defraud the IRS and had seven, four, and three years added to their original sentences, respectively.

Notable inmates (current and former)

See also
List of U.S. federal prisons
Federal Bureau of Prisons
Incarceration in the United States

References

External links
 Bureau of Prisons website

Federal Correctional Institutions in the United States
Companies based in Lassen County, California
Prisons in California
2007 establishments in California